Craniocervical instability (CCI) is a medical condition where there is excessive movement of the vertebrae at the atlanto-occipital joint and the atlanto-axial joint, that is, between the skull and the top two vertebrae (C1 and C2). This can cause neuronal injury and compression of nearby structures including the spinal cord, brain stem, vertebral artery or vagus nerve, causing a constellation of symptoms. It is frequently co-morbid with atlanto-axial instability, Chiari malformation and tethered cord syndrome.

It is more common in people with a connective tissue disease, notably Ehlers-Danlos Syndrome, osteogenesis imperfecta and rheumatoid arthritis. It can be brought on by a trauma, frequently whiplash; laxity of the ligaments surrounding the joint; or other damage to the surrounding connective tissue.

Symptoms and signs
The impact of craniocervical instability can range from minor symptoms to severe disability, with some patients being bed-bound. The constellation of symptoms caused by craniocervical instability has been labelled the cervico-medullary syndrome. Common symptoms include:

 Occipital headaches
 Migraine Headaches 
 neck, shoulder and jaw pain 
 difficulty swallowing, or the sensation of being choked
 tenderness at base of skull
 feeling of 'bobble-head', where the skull may 'fall off' the spine
 photophobia
 double or blurred vision
anxiety
 tinnitus
 tremors
 orthostatic intolerance
 vertigo or dizziness
 palpitations 
 shortness of breath
 nausea
 fatigue
 Lhermitte's sign
 cognitive and memory decline
 clumsiness and motor delay
 fainting
 weakness of the limbs

Symptoms are frequently worsened by a Valsalva maneuver or by being upright for long periods of time. Lying supine can bring short-term relief.  The reason that being upright is problematic is that gravity is allowing increased interaction between the brain stem and the top of the spinal column, increasing symptoms.  Lying supine eliminates the downward gravitational pull, reducing symptoms to some degree.  Lying with the feet somewhat higher and head lower (Trendelenberg) allows gravity to work somewhat in the patient's favor.

Diagnosis
Craniocervical instability is usually diagnosed through neuro-anatomical measurement using radiography. Digital Motion X-ray is considered the most accurate method. Upright magnetic resonance imaging, supine magnetic resonance imaging, CT scan, and flexion and extension x-rays may also be used but are far less accurate and have a much higher potential for false negatives.

The measurements to diagnose craniocervical instability are:
 Clivo-Axial Angle equal or less than 135 degrees
 Grabb-Oakes measurement equal or greater than 9 mm
 Harris measurement greater than 12mm
 Spinal subluxation

Alternatively, craniocervical instability can be diagnosed if a trial of cervical traction, typically using a halo fixation device, results in a significant alleviation of symptoms.

Treatment
Conservative treatment of craniocervical instability includes physical therapy and the use of a cervical collar to keep the neck stable. Cervical spinal fusion is performed on patients with more severe symptoms. Prolotherapy, including with stem cells, is another treatment option used, but there is limited scientific evidence on this approach.

See also

 Hypermobility spectrum disorder

References

External links 
 Ehlers Danlos Society
 Bobby Jones Chiari & Syringomyelia Foundation

Human diseases and disorders
Medical terminology